was a  after Kansei and before Bunka. This period spanned the years from February 1801 through February 1804.

Change of era
 February 5, 1801: a new era name was created because of the belief that the 58th year of every cycle of the Chinese zodiac brings great changes. The previous era ended and a new one commenced in Kansei 13.

The new era name was drawn from an hortatory aphorism:  "Follow Heaven and take your destiny, unite all people and perfect your righteousness" (順乎天而享其運、応乎人而和其義).

Events of the Kyōwa era
 December 9, 1802 (Kyōwa 2, 15th day of the 11th month): Earthquake in northwest Honshū and Sado Island (Latitude: 37.700/Longitude: 138.300), 6.6 magnitude on the Richter Scale.
 December 28, 1802 (Kyōwa 2, 4th day of the 12th month): Earthquake on Sado Island (Latitude: 38.000/Longitude: 138.000).

Notes

References
 Nussbaum, Louis Frédéric and Käthe Roth. (2005). Japan Encyclopedia. Cambridge: Harvard University Press. ; OCLC 48943301

External links 

 National Diet Library, "The Japanese Calendar" -- historical overview plus illustrative images from library's collection

Japanese eras
1800s in Japan